Frederick Lewis Bishop Jennings (18 March 1874 – 21 December 1946) was an English cricketer who played for Somerset. He was born in Taunton, Somerset and died at Boscombe, Bournemouth, then in Hampshire.

Jennings played in just one game for Somerset, against Essex in 1895. Batting in the lower order, Jennings scored a duck in his first innings and seven runs in his second.

References

1874 births
1946 deaths
English cricketers
Somerset cricketers
Sportspeople from Taunton